Raphael "Ray" Schnell (May 1, 1893 – April 5, 1970) was a North Dakota Republican Party politician who served as the 23rd Lieutenant Governor of North Dakota from 1951 to 1953 under Governor Clarence Norman Brunsdale. Schnell also served in the North Dakota House from 1939 to 1940, 1943–1946, and 1963–1964. Schnell died in 1970 of cancer at age 77.

Notes

Lieutenant Governors of North Dakota
1893 births
1970 deaths
Republican Party members of the North Dakota House of Representatives
20th-century American politicians